The No Border Network (In the United Kingdom also called "No Borders Network" or "Noborders Network") refers to loose associations of autonomous organisations, groups, and individuals in Western Europe, Central Europe, Eastern Europe and beyond. They support freedom of movement and resist human migration control by coordinating international border camps, demonstrations, direct actions, and anti-deportation campaigns.

The Western European network opposes what it says are increasingly restrictive harmonisation of asylum and immigration policy in Europe, and aims to build alliances among migrant laborers and refugees. Common slogans used by the Network include; "No Border, No Nation, Stop Deportations!" and "No one is illegal."

No Border Network has existed since 1999, and its website since 2000. The No Borders Network in the United Kingdom claims to have local groups in 11 cities.

No Border Camps
Groups from the No Border network have been involved in organising a number of protest camps (called "No Border Camps" or sometimes "Border Camps" or "Transborder Camps"), e.g. in Strasbourg, France (2002), Otranto, Italy (2003), Cologne (2003, 2012), Gatwick Airport (2007), United Kingdom, at Patras, Greece, Dikili, Turkey (2008), Calais, France (2009, 2015), Lesvos, Greece (2009), Brussels, Belgium (2010), Siva Reka, Bulgaria (2011), Stockholm, Sweden (2012), Rotterdam, the Netherlands (2013), Ventimiglia, Italy (2015), Thessaloniki, Greece (2016), near Nantes, France (2019) in Wassenaar, Netherlands (2019), near Nantes, France (2022), and in Rotterdam, Netherlands (2022).

Activities

On 18 December 2007, to coincide with the UN International Migrants Day, the network carried out a coordinated blockade of Border and Immigration Agency (now UK Border Agency) offices in Bristol, Portsmouth, Newcastle and Glasgow to prevent dawn raids by immigration officers from taking place. This form of action has been repeated across the UK by the network several times since.

On 24 October 2008, Phil Woolas, UK Minister of State for Borders and Immigration was pied by No Borders activists following his remarks on population control.

On 10 August 2013, No Border groups from The Netherlands squatted a large terrain at Rotterdam to gather and held several demonstrations.

In February 2010 No Borders groups from the UK and France opened a large centre for refugees sleeping rough in Calais, France, under the name "Kronstadt Hangar".

Calais authorities have accused "extremist activists" within to the No Borders network of being "driven by an anarchist ideology of hatred of all laws and frontiers" and engaging in, and encouraging, violence and harassment against French police and social workers at the Calais Jungle migrant camp, as well as "manipulating" and "misleading" the migrants living there.

After the intercultural philosophy journal "polylog" demanded in connection with the book "Global Freedom of Movement: A Philosophical Plea for Open Borders" that the "debate on freedom of migration or restrictions on immigration should be received more strongly in the context of intercultural philosophizing", new local groups such as NoBorder. NoProblem oriented themselves to international migration-sensitive contributions - also in connection with Islamic and decolonial feminisms, degrowth, global ecofeminisms, or the "ethnic studies" less known in the German-speaking world. The group is a student-run independent project of the Institute of Philosophy at the University of Hildesheim, which itself conducts research on philosophies in global perspective.

Publications
Freedom to Move, Freedom to Stay: a No Borders Reader. London: No Borders, 2007.
James A. Chamberlain. Minoritarian Democracy: The Democratic Case for No Borders Constellations: An International Journal of Critical and Democratic Theory (forthcoming)

See also
Glasgow Girls (activists)
UNITY (asylum seekers organisation)
No one is illegal
No Borders Orchestra
 Hellenic Rescue Team
 Iuventa
 Chiara Lauvergnac
 Mediterranea Saving Humans
 Migrant Offshore Aid Station
 Proactiva Open Arms
 Sea-Watch
 SOS Méditerranée
 NoBorder. NoProblem

References

Other sources
.
.
.
.
.
.
.

External links
No Border Network
No Borders Network UK

Anti-nationalism in Europe
Immigrant rights activism
Political movements
Illegal immigration to Europe
Direct action